Ronald Binge (15 July 1910 – 6 September 1979) was a British composer and arranger of light music. He arranged many of Mantovani's most famous pieces before composing his own music, which included Elizabethan Serenade and Sailing By.

Biography
Binge was born in a working-class neighbourhood in Derby, Derbyshire, in the English Midlands. In his childhood he was a chorister at Saint Andrews Church (Church of England), London Road, Derby – 'the railwaymen's church' (demolished 1970). Binge was educated at the Derby School of Music, where he studied the organ. Early in his career he was a cinema organist, and later worked in summer orchestras in British seaside resorts (including Blackpool and Great Yarmouth), for which he learned to play the piano accordion. Binge's skill as a cinema organist was put to good use, and he played the organ in Mantovani's first band, the Tipica Orchestra. During the Second World War, he served in the Royal Air Force, during which time he was much in demand organising in-camp entertainment.

After the war, Mantovani offered Binge the job of arranging and composing for his new orchestra. With Mantovani, Binge also orchestrated Noël Coward’s musicals Pacific 1860 (1946) and Ace of Clubs (1950). In 1951, his arrangement of Charmaine gave him and Mantovani worldwide success and recognition. However, he tired of writing arrangements, and turned to composing original works and film scores. Mantovani's orchestra began playing his light orchestral pieces for radio broadcast, and in 1952 Binge devised and conducted his own BBC radio programme called String Song, playing many of his own compositions. He regularly composed for production and library music publishers, and a number of his works were used for radio and television signature tunes.

Binge married his wife Vera Simmons in 1945. During the 1950s they lived at 18, Smitham Bottom Lane in Purley, Croydon. He died in Ringwood, Hampshire, of liver cancer in 1979, aged 69, survived by his wife, son and daughter.

Commemoration
In early 2013, Derby City Council and Derby Civic Society announced they would put a blue plaque on one of his two early homes in Derby (83 Darby Street, Normanton, or 29 Wiltshire Road, Chaddesden).

Compositions
Binge was interested in the technicalities of composition and was most famous as the inventor of the "cascading strings" effect that is the signature sound of the Mantovani orchestra, much used in their arrangements of popular music. First heard on the hit Charmaine (1951) it was originally created to capture the essence of the echo properties of a building such as a cathedral, although it later became particularly associated with easy-listening music.

Binge's catalogue includes hundreds of works, most of them light orchestral. His first big compositional success was the orchestral overture Spitfire, composed in Blackpool while he was still on RAF service, which predated William Walton's orchestral tribute by a year. Best known today is probably Elizabethan Serenade (1951), which was used by the British Broadcasting Corporation as the theme for the popular 1950s series, "Music Tapestry," and as the play-out for the British Forces Network radio station, and for which in 1957 he won an Ivor Novello Award. It was later turned into a vocal version called "Where the Gentle Avon Flows", with lyrics by the poet Christopher Hassall. A reggae version of the tune, "Elizabethan Reggae", was performed by Boris Gardiner in 1970.

Binge is also known for Sailing By (1963), which introduces the late-night Shipping Forecast on BBC Radio 4. Other well-known pieces include Miss Melanie (used as the theme for the CBS Network's radio comedy The Couple Next Door from 1957-1960), Like Old Times, The Watermill (1958) for oboe and strings, and his Concerto for Alto Saxophone in E-flat major (1956). His largest, longest, and most ambitious work is the four-movement Symphony in C ("Saturday Symphony"), which was written during his retirement between 1966 and 1968, and performed in Britain and Germany. It was recorded by the South German Radio Orchestra, conducted by the composer.

Less well known is a 1948 piano piece known as "Vice Versa", a musical palindrome which was not only a front-to-back palindrome, but also exploited the two staves used for writing for piano. The music reads the same whichever way it is turned. He later extended this theme, composing a piece known as "Upside/Downside" for his son, who was learning to play the recorder at Downside School. This musical palindrome was for piano, recorder and cello and again was universally reversible – two players could play from the same sheet of music reading from opposite ends.

Selected works

References

External links
 Ronald Binge, composer website
Biography at the Robert Farnon Society
Classical Composers Database (with photo)
Biography at Chaddesden Historical Group (Derby)
Obituary by George Pollen, copyist to R Binge
Photogallery on Obituary to R Binge

1910 births
1979 deaths
English classical composers
Light music composers
20th-century classical composers
Musicians from Derby
Deaths from liver cancer
Deaths from cancer in England
Theatre organists
20th-century English composers
English male classical composers
20th-century organists
20th-century English male musicians
Royal Air Force personnel of World War II